Oluwasegun Olubi (born November 1, 1999) is an American football linebacker for the Indianapolis Colts of the National Football League (NFL).

Early life and education
Olubi was born on November 1, 1999, in Downingtown, Pennsylvania. His family moved to New Jersey soon after his birth, then to St. Paul, Minnesota, when he was two, and later to Bullhead City, Arizona. At 10 years old, his family moved to London, England, where he spent some time before moving back to Bullhead City and later to Corona, California. He attended Centennial High School in Corona and was a three-year varsity letter winner in both football and track and field. His bests in track were 11.33 (seconds) in the 100 meters and 23.23 in the 200 meters. Olubi also recorded a 22' 3'' long jump and a school-record 45' 11'' triple jump. In football, he recorded 38 tackles, an interception and one pass breakup in eight games as a senior, earning all-league honors.

Olubi began his college career by attending the College of Idaho, in Caldwell, whose football team competes in the National Association of Intercollegiate Athletics (NAIA). In one season there, he placed second on the team in tackles with 85, and additionally made a half-sack, 10 pass breakups, one fumble forced and a kick blocked. Olubi then transferred to Saddleback College in Mission Viejo, California, recording a team-leading 54 tackles, two sacks, and an interception in his only season at the school. At Saddleback, he "made his way without a meal plan by foraging at his two burger jobs with Five Guys and In-N-Out," according to The San Diego Union-Tribune.

Ollubi transferred to Harding University in Searcy, Arkansas, in 2019, but only spent one year there as he decided to leave when they discontinued his economics major. In his one season with the football team, he appeared in 12 games, recording 23 tackles, 5.5 sacks and a fumble recovery. In 2020, Olubi joined San Diego State University, having been given a chance as a walk-on after convincing the team through a coach who knew one of their coaches.

Olubi saw limited playing time in his first season with the football team, a Division I FBS program. In seven games as a backup, he recorded 15 tackles, five of which were solo. His highlight of the season came against Hawaii, where he recorded a 71-yard interception return touchdown. Prior to the 2021 season, it was announced that he had been put on scholarship. He was also voted team captain by teammates for the season. Olubi appeared in 14 games in 2021, seven of which he started, recording 53 total tackles, two sacks and two forced fumbles. He was among the 88 nominees for the Burlsworth Trophy, given to the best player who started his college career as a walk-on, but ultimately did not win it.

Professional career

San Francisco 49ers
After going unselected in the 2022 NFL Draft, Olubi was signed by the San Francisco 49ers as an undrafted free agent. He was released at the final roster cuts.

Indianapolis Colts
Afterwards, Olubi was signed to the practice squad of the Indianapolis Colts. He was elevated to the active roster for their Week 16 game against the Los Angeles Chargers, and made his debut in the loss, appearing on nine special teams snaps. He appeared in one further game in 2022 and posted a single tackle. Olubi signed a reserve/future contract on January 9, 2023.

References

External links
 Indianapolis Colts bio
 San Diego State Aztecs bio

1999 births
Living people
American football linebackers
American football cornerbacks
People from Downingtown, Pennsylvania
People from New Jersey
People from Saint Paul, Minnesota
People from London
People from Bullhead City, Arizona
People from Corona, California
College of Idaho Coyotes football players
Saddleback Gauchos football
Harding Bisons football players
San Diego State Aztecs football players
San Francisco 49ers players
Indianapolis Colts players
Players of American football from Pennsylvania